Wayan is a small unincorporated community, located 35 miles north of Soda Springs in Caribou County, Idaho, United States.  Located on State Highway 34, it is part of a valley known as Grays Lake, and its zip code is 83285. Wayan is located at 42.978 N and 111.376 W. The community was named after its first post master and his wife.

External links
City info

Unincorporated communities in Idaho
Unincorporated communities in Caribou County, Idaho